Adult Contemporary is a chart published by Billboard ranking the top-performing songs in the United States in the adult contemporary music (AC) market.  In 1979, 19 songs topped the chart, based on playlists submitted by radio stations.  The chart was published under the title Easy Listening through the issue of Billboard dated March 31 and Adult Contemporary thereafter.

On the first chart of the year, Scottish singer Al Stewart held the top spot with "Time Passages", which was in its ninth week at number one.  The song would end its run at the top after ten weeks, the longest run at number one on the chart for more than ten years.  Stewart had been a recording artist since the mid-1960s and would remain active for more than forty years, but his U.S. chart success was confined to a three-year period at the end of the 1970s.  Canadian singer Anne Murray was the only act with more than one number one in 1979.  One of Canada's biggest musical exports of the 1970s, Murray topped the US country and Adult Contemporary charts, as well as Billboards all-genres listing, the Hot 100.  In 1979 she topped the Easy Listening/AC chart with "I Just Fall in Love Again" in February and March, "Shadows in the Moonlight" in June, and "Broken Hearted Me" in October and November, and spent a total of 13 weeks in the top spot.

The country rock band Poco had the longest unbroken run at number one during the year, spending seven consecutive weeks in the top spot with "Crazy Love".  The song was eventually knocked from the top of the chart in the issue of Billboard dated April 28 by "I Never Said I Love You" by Orsa Lia.  One of the most obscure acts to top the chart, Lia never placed any other songs on any of Billboards charts, and there is no record of her having released another album after her self-titled 1979 debut.  Other acts who gained their only AC number ones in 1979 included British singer Maxine Nightingale, who unusually had three separate runs in the top spot with "Lead Me On", and J. D. Souther, who had a five-week run at number one with "You're Only Lonely".  Souther experienced a brief period of chart success in his own right, but is better known as a session musician and songwriter.  Only one AC number one of 1979 also topped the Hot 100: trumpeter Herb Alpert reached the top spot on both charts with his instrumental "Rise".  The final AC number one of the year was "Send One Your Love" by Stevie Wonder.

Chart history

References

See also
1979 in music
List of artists who reached number one on the U.S. Adult Contemporary chart

1979
1979 record charts
1979 in American music